In myrmecology, a solarium is an earthen structure constructed by certain members of the Formicidae for the purpose of brood incubation. Solaria are usually dome-shaped and fashioned from a paper-thin layer of soil, connected to the main nest by way of subterranean runs.

Tapinoma erraticum is an example of a solaria-constructing species whose skill at so doing was noted by Horace Donisthorpe in the early 20th century in his book British Ants, their Life Histories and Classification.

Myrmecology
Shelters built or used by animals